Méline Pierret (born 18 January 1999) is a Swiss volleyball player. She is a member of the Women's National Team.
She participated at the 2018 Montreux Volley Masters.

She plays for Sm’Aesch Pfeffingen.

In the past, she played for TS Volley Düdingen Power Cats.

References

External links 
FIVB Profile
Méline Pierret profile at Volleybox

Melissa interviews Swiss Setter, Meline Pierret! (FR) THU 6 SEP 2018

1999 births
Living people
People from Fribourg
Swiss women's volleyball players